This is a list of the 16 members of the European Parliament for Denmark in the 1999 to 2004 session.

List

Party representation

Notes

Sources
 List of Danish MEPs (in Danish)

1999
List
Denmark